This article is a list of current National Football League (NFL) team staffs.

AFC East

Buffalo Bills

Miami Dolphins

New England Patriots

New York Jets

AFC North

Baltimore Ravens

Cincinnati Bengals

Cleveland Browns

Pittsburgh Steelers

AFC South

Houston Texans

Indianapolis Colts

Jacksonville Jaguars

Tennessee Titans

AFC West

Denver Broncos

Kansas City Chiefs

Las Vegas Raiders

Los Angeles Chargers

NFC East

Dallas Cowboys

New York Giants

Philadelphia Eagles

Washington Commanders

NFC North

Chicago Bears

Detroit Lions

Green Bay Packers

Minnesota Vikings

NFC South

Atlanta Falcons

Carolina Panthers

New Orleans Saints

Tampa Bay Buccaneers

NFC West

Arizona Cardinals

Los Angeles Rams

San Francisco 49ers

Seattle Seahawks

National Football League coaches
Staff
National Football League staffs